Kuzmin is a village located in the municipality of Sremska Mitrovica, Serbia. As of 2011 census, the village has a population of 2,982 inhabitants.

Name
In Serbian, the village is known as Kuzmin (Кузмин), and in Hungarian as Kozmadamján.

Historical population
1961: 4,086
1971: 3,888
1981: 3,730
1991: 3,491
2002: 3,391

See also
List of places in Serbia
List of cities, towns and villages in Vojvodina

References

 Slobodan Ćurčić, Broj stanovnika Vojvodine, Novi Sad, 1996.
 Petar Vizićanin, "Stanovništvo kuzmina od 1935."

External links
Sremski Mali Oglasi
Stanovnistvo Kuzmina od 1935

Populated places in Syrmia
Sremska Mitrovica